The Mirdom of Wakhan was a small subjugated principality located in the Wakhan Corridor which had existed since the time of the Sāsānids.  It was eventually annexed into Emirate of Afghanistan in 1883.

History 
Wakhan has notably existed since the time of the Sasanids when it was subjugated by them in 224 until 651 when the authority there collapsed.  They were also subjugated by the Hephthalities, the First Turkic Khaganate, the Tibetans, the Tang, the Samanids, and later many Turko-Mongol Khaqanates of Central Asia until their eventual subjugation by the Afghans and the Russian in the late nineteenth century.  When the Anglo-Russian rivalry escalated, many Central Asian Khanates and mirdoms had started to fight for survival including Wakhan due to their Badakhshī subjugators getting annexed by the Afghans.  Qing forces had also started expanding across East Turkestan and beyond eventually annexing the princely state of Sariqul.  Britain, Russia, and China had started expanding near the princely states with the Russians already conquering the former Khiva Khanate in 1867.

In 1870, British Indian officers had sent Fayz Bakhsh, a British Indian spy, to the Wakhan and later to Saint Petersburg to discuss plans to recognise Wakhan.  The Foreign Minister of Russia, Alexander Gorchakov discussed plans with Thomas Douglas Forsyth on Wakhan and later with the Qing, and they all set forth with the annexation of Wakhan into Afghanistan in 1883.

Administrative Divisions 
During the time of colonial expansion, the mir of Wakhan had organised four districts called a sada which means 100 in Wakhi.  The districts were Sada-yi Panja (پنجه), Sada-yi Khandut (خاندت), Sada-yi Ishtrakh (اِشترخ), and Sada-yi Sarhad (سرحد).  The capital city was Qalʾa-yi Panja until the twentieth century, when Khandut became the new capital.  During the Sasanid times, the capital was Sakāshīm (city of the Sakas) which is today known as Ishkāshīm.

Demographics 
The main group in Wakhan was the Wakhi people, an Eastern Iranian people who were descendants of the old Sakas.  There were also a huge number of Qirghiz, who lived near the Wakhan River.  The Qirghiz were often discriminated by the Wakhi and had to pay more taxes than them.

Rulers 
The rulers were known as mirs and always believed they were from foreign descent.  The last two mirs claimed they were decedents of Alexander the Great.  A clear list of the Wakhi rulers are not known, but notable ones include Rahim Bek, Jahan Khan, and Aman ul-Mulk.

References 

Wakhan
Wakhi people
History of Afghanistan
History of Badakhshan Province